The Men's 200m breaststroke event at the 2010 South American Games was held on March 29, with the heats at 10:09 and the Final at 18:00.

Medalists

Records

Results

Heats

Final

References
Heats
Final

Breast 200m M